Acanthonyx dentatus, the toothed decorator crab, is a species of crab in the family Inachidae.

Distribution
It is also known from the Red Sea.

Description
It is usually a well camouflaged crab, decorating its carapace with hydroids and seaweeds, offering camouflage and also defence, since hydroids sting and many seaweeds are chemically noxious. Its carapace is teardrop-shaped with two sharp spines projecting forwards between its eyes. There are two marginal spines on its carapace. It has stubby legs. It is a vivid pink-red to a dull brown in colour.

Ecology
Vividly coloured when recently moulted, these animals are commonly found taking refuge among groups of striped anemones. The crabs use the anemones' habit of shooting sticky defensive threads through their body walls for their own defence.

References

Majoidea
Crustaceans described in 1834
Taxa named by Henri Milne-Edwards